Rakvere linnastaadion is a multi-purpose stadium in Rakvere, Estonia. The stadium holds 1,785 seating places and is the home ground of Rakvere JK Tarvas. The address of the stadium is Kastani puiestee 12, Rakvere.

Although being a small venue, the stadium hosted three group stage matches of the 2012 UEFA European Under-19 Football Championship, with notable and later world-famous players such as Paul Pogba, Harry Kane, Aleksandar Mitrović and many others all running onto the Rakvere field. 

The stadium has also hosted one Estonia national football team match, several Europa League qualification matches of Narva Trans and one season of Estonian top-flight football, when Tarvas played in Meistriliiga in the 2016 season.

2o12 UEFA European U19 Championship matches

Estonia national team matches

References

External links
Home page
Rakvere staadion
ZeroZero

Football venues in Estonia
Buildings and structures in Lääne-Viru County
Multi-purpose stadiums in Estonia
Athletics (track and field) venues in Estonia